Andrew N. Forde (born January 21, 1987) is a Canadian engineering graduate student and musician.

Education and career
Forde is a Materials Science and Engineering alumnus of the University of Toronto. In 2012, Forde was a Master's student in Engineering Entrepreneurship and Innovation at McMaster University. 

Forde's first start-up, Sommerfeld Solutions, operated in the areas of mining, information technology, and healthcare. The Electronic Chart (TEC), a sommerfeld project, was one of 30 projects to receive funds through a funding initiative from McMaster and the Federal Economic Development Initiative for Northern Ontario. TEC was a project intended to improve patient charting practices by creating software to improve the efficiency of patient processing. It aimed to place "a computer tablet beside every hospital bed in the world as a way of making it easier for doctors to treat their patients."

Forde established The Forde Institute which was designed to be "a non-profit global centre for research, focusing on technological innovations and their resulting impact on humanity to promote responsible innovation, research and entrepreneurship."

Awards
The University of Toronto Chapter of the National Society of Black Engineers (NSBE, a student-run organization) received the 2010 International Pioneer Chapter of the Year Award from NSBE’s National Executive Board and International Committee. At the time, Forde was an out-going President of the Chapter.

Forde received an Aroni Award in 2011.

Forde was awarded the Harry Jerome Young Entrepreneur Award by Toronto's Black Business and Professional Association in 2012 for his work on TEC.

Music

Forde was trained by a Thornhill violin teacher Martin Bazarian and attended the Unionville Highschool of the Arts. It is claimed that Forde played for audiences throughout the country, sharing the stage with the likes of Justin Bieber and Kardinal Offishall.

In 2020, Forde performed on FreeUp! The Emancipation Day Special.

References

External links
 

1987 births
Living people
University of Toronto alumni
Canadian engineers
21st-century Canadian violinists and fiddlers
Black Canadian musicians
Canadian male violinists and fiddlers